Ding Wei may refer to:

 Ding Wei (Go player) (born 1979), Chinese professional Go player
 Ding Wei (Song dynasty) (c. 966–1037), Song dynasty chancellor
 James Ting (born 1951), or Ding Wei, Chinese-Canadian businessman